The shade bush warbler or shade warbler (Horornis parens) is a species of bird in the family Cettiidae.
It is found only in Solomon Islands, where it is endemic to the island of Makira (formerly San Cristobal Island).
Its natural habitats are tropical moist lowland forests and tropical moist montane forest above 600m. It feeds on insects in the undergrowth and on the ground.

References

Endemic fauna of the Solomon Islands
Horornis
Birds described in 1935
Taxonomy articles created by Polbot
Endemic birds of the Solomon Islands